Tomáš Havlín (born 13 July 1996) is a Czech professional ice hockey player. He is currently playing for HC Bílí Tygři Liberec of the Czech Extraliga.

Havlín made his Czech Extraliga debut playing with HC Bílí Tygři Liberec during the 2015-16 Czech Extraliga season.

References

External links

1996 births
Living people
HC Benátky nad Jizerou players
HC Bílí Tygři Liberec players
Rytíři Kladno players
Czech ice hockey defencemen
Sportspeople from Jablonec nad Nisou
HC Karlovy Vary players